Sten Sture the Younger (1493 – 3 February 1520), was a Swedish nobleman who served as the regent of Sweden, during the era of the Kalmar Union.

Biography
Sture was born in 1493, as the son of Svante Nilsson (regent of Sweden) and Iliana Gisladotter Gädda, heiress of Ulvåsa.
At the death of his father, regent Svante, Sture was only 18 years old. High Councillor Eric Trolle was chosen as regent by the High Council. He supported the union with Denmark. However, Sture utilized the castles and troops fiefed to him by his late father and executed a coup. After Sture promised to continue union negotiations with Denmark, the High Council accepted him as regent replacing Eric Trolle.

In reality, Sture's purpose was to keep Sweden independent from Denmark. He adopted the Sture surname, heritage from his great-grandmother, because it symbolized independence from Denmark and as a reminder of Sten Sture the Elder, his father's third cousin.

Conflict soon arose between Sture as regent and Gustav Trolle, Archbishop of Uppsala, and son of Eric Trolle. The archbishop claimed more autonomy for the church. Sture had Trolle removed from his office and imprisoned.

Sture knew that sooner or later, a war with King Hans of Denmark (died 1513) or his son and successor King Christian II would be inevitable. Therefore, in 1513 he agreed to a truce with Russia.

When Christian II started an invasion of Sweden, Sture was mortally wounded at the battle of Bogesund on 19 January 1520 and died on the ice of lake Mälaren on his way back to Stockholm. This was during the later part of Christian II of Denmark's war against Sweden.

Christian II was enthroned in Sweden in November 1520 and archbishop Gustav had his revenge against supporters of Sture and against those who deposed the archbishop: he listed those enemies and accusations against them, denouncing them as heretics. King Christian had those accused executed at the Stockholm Bloodbath (Stockholms blodbad) in November 1520, including Sten Sture's corpse which was desecrated as that of a heretic by being burnt at the stake.

Personal life
His marriage in 1511 to Christina Gyllenstierna, great-granddaughter of King Charles VIII, produced the son Svante Stensson Sture, later elevated to Riksmarsk  and  Count  of  Stegeholm. In the 20th century, his distant direct descendant, Princess Sibylla of Saxe-Coburg and Gotha married the hereditary Prince Gustaf Adolf. Their son was  King Carl XVI Gustav of Sweden.

References

Other sources
 
 
Greta Wieselgren (1949) Sten Sture d.y. och Gustav Trolle    (Stockholm: Gleerup,)

External links

 

1493 births
1520 deaths
15th-century Swedish people
16th-century Swedish politicians
16th-century viceregal rulers
Rulers of Finland
Regents of Sweden
Swedish nobility
Stockholm Bloodbath
Swedish military personnel killed in action